Cyrtoneritimorpha, also Cyrtoneritida, is a clade of fossil sea snails, marine gastropod mollusks within the clade Neritimorpha.

This order contains two extinct families: Orthonychiidae and Vltaviellidae.

References

The Paleobiology Database

Prehistoric gastropods